Sound of the Republic is the fourth studio album by Swedish hardcore punk band Raised Fist.

Track listing
You Ignore Them All – 3:32
Perfectly Broken – 3:11
Sunlight – 3:01
Sound of the Republic – 2:52
Killing It – 3:27
Back – 2:35
Hertz Island Escapades – 2:40
Some of These Times – 3:36
Nation of Incomplete – 2:23
And Then They Run – 3:38
Bleed Under My Pen – 2:27
Time Will Let You Go; All Alone, I Break – 3:55

Previously-Unreleased Version of Time Will Let You Go
A rare, early version of Time Will Let You Go was released on the second disc of Burning Heart's Heartattack Vol. 1 Compilation. In contrast to the hard rock version heard on Sound of the Republic, the Heartattack version is a tekno-metal-hardcore version which is much more listener-friendly than the version found on Sound of the Republic. The  Heartattack version also is part of a collection of demo recordings which secured Raised Fist a recording contract. The Heartattack version is listed on the CD packaging and disc art as simply Time Will Let You Go instead of Time Will Let You Go; All Alone, I Break as seen on Sound of the Republic.

Musicians
 Marco Eronen - Guitar
 Daniel Holmberg - Guitar
 Matte Modin - Drums
 Andreas "Josse" Johansson - Bass
 Alexander "Alle" Hagman - Vocals

References

2006 albums
Raised Fist albums
Burning Heart Records albums